Jolgeh may refer to:
Jolgeh District
Jolgeh Rural District (disambiguation)
Jolgeh-ye Musaabad Rural District
Jolgeh Sedeh